"I Wanna Get Next to You" is a 1976 soul single written, composed and produced by American songwriter and producer Norman Whitfield, and most famously sung by American R&B band Rose Royce. It is the third official single from the Car Wash soundtrack. The song has also become a staple on oldies radio and on adult contemporary stations.

Background
The song talks about how a narrator pleads love for a beautiful woman, except that the young woman is unkind, and does not understand his affection for her, as he wastes his own money calling her, but she does not respond, regardless, he still wants to "get next to" her.

Chart performance
The song became the group's second top 10 single on the US Billboard Hot 100, peaking at number 10, and peaking at number 3 on the Hot Soul Singles chart. The song was also successful worldwide, becoming their second top 40 hit in the United Kingdom, peaking at number 14 on the UK Singles Chart.

Weekly charts

Year-end charts

References

1977 songs
1977 singles
Songs written by Norman Whitfield
Rose Royce songs
Song recordings produced by Norman Whitfield
Soul ballads
1970s ballads
MCA Records singles